The Bangladesh Institute of Information Technology (BIIT) is a private polytechnic institute in Bogra, Bangladesh. It was established in 1999. The institute is recognized by the Bangladesh Technical Education Board (BTEB), Dhaka, Bangladesh. Institute Code No. 20092 given by BTEB.

History
Bangladesh Institute of Information Technology (BIIT) was established in 1999 by its founder Engr. Md. Shahabuddin Saikat. In early time it was a Computer Training Center. For their Significant role & success in 2002, It was started four years long Diploma in Engineering Course under Bangladesh Technical Education Board. In this time, only Computer technology was started. Electrical, Electronics, Civil, Mechanical, Automobile, Architecture & Telecommunication Technology course was include later. After that, four years long Diploma in Textile Engineering Course was started under Bangladesh Technical Education Board with 2 technology Garments Design and Pattern Making & Textile Engineering.

Departments
Diploma in Engineering
 Architecture Technology
 Automobile Technology
 Computer Technology
 Electrical Technology
 Electronics Technology
 Mechanical Technology
 Telecommunication Technology
 Civil Technology
Diploma in Textile Engineering
 Garments Design and Pattern Making Technology
 Textile Technology

See also 
 Ministry of Education
 Education in Bangladesh
 Bogra Polytechnic Institute
 Dhaka Polytechnic Institute
 Dhaka University of Engineering and Technology

References

Education in Bangladesh
Educational institutions established in 1999
1999 establishments in Bangladesh